Janez is a Slovene form of the given name John.

 Janez Burger (born 1965), film director
 Janez Drnovšek (1950–2008), second president of Slovenia
 Janez Drozg (1933–2005), film director
 Janez Janša (born 1958), fifth prime minister of Slovenia
 Janez Lapajne (born 1967), film director
 Janez Semrajč
 Janez Vajkard Valvasor (1641–1693), Slovene name of Johann Weikhard von Valvasor, scholar and polymath, member of the Royal Society

References

Slovene masculine given names